Carling is an English surname, similar to Carlin, Curlin and Curling.

List of people with the surname 

 Thomas Carling (fl. 1840), the founder of Carling Beer
 John Carling (1828–1911), his son and prominent historical Ontario politician
 John R. Carling (fl. 1902–1910), writer, author of historical novels
 Will Carling (born 1965), former England Rugby Union captain
 Victoria Carling, English radio, television, film and theatre actress
 Gunhild Carling, Swedish jazz musician

Surnames
English-language surnames
Surnames of English origin
Surnames of British Isles origin